Byron Shire is a local government area located in the Northern Rivers region of New South Wales, Australia. The shire was named for Cape Byron, itself named by Captain James Cook in May 1770 in honour of Vice-Admiral John Byron.

Michael Lyon was first elected Mayor to fill a casual vacancy on Thursday 13 May 2021 and then popularly elected at the Council elections on December 4, 2021.

History
On 16 May 1906, a temporary council of five members was appointed to administer it, and elections were held in November. On 4 December, the council convened for the first time with William Baker as its inaugural president. William Baker was born in Great Stanmore, England. His cousin, Alfred Joseph Baker was the first person to score a goal in international football against Scotland in 1870.

On 1 July 1908, the Mullumbimby Municipality was created out of part of Byron. On 1 October 1980, the municipality and the shire were re-amalgamated by direction of the NSW Minister for Local Government.

Heritage listings 
The Byron Shire has a number of heritage-listed sites, including:
 High Conservation Value Old Growth forest

Towns and localities

 Byron (SE)

 Byron Bay
 Bangalow
 Broken Head
 Coopers Shoot
 Ewingsdale
 Hayters Hill
 McLeods Shoot
 Newrybar (shared with Ballina)
 Skinners Shoot
 Suffolk Park
 Talofa
 Tyagarah

 Mullumbimby/Brunswick (NE)

 Mullumbimby
 Brunswick Heads
 Billinudgel
 Crabbes Creek
 Montecollum
 Mullumbimby Creek
 Myocum
 New Brighton
 Ocean Shores
 South Golden Beach
 The Pocket
 Wilsons Creek
 Wooyung (shared with Tweed)
 Yelgun

 Other (W)

 Binna Burra
 Booyong (shared with Lismore)
 Coorabell
 Eureka
 Federal
 Goonengerry
 Huonbrook
 Koonyum Range
 Main Arm
 Middle Pocket
 Nashua
 Palmwoods
 Possum Creek
 Repentance Creek
 Upper Coopers Creek
 Upper Main Arm
 Upper Wilsons Creek
 Wanganui

Demographics
In the 2016 census, there were  people in the Byron local government area, of these 48.2 per cent were male and 51.8 per cent were female. Aboriginal and Torres Strait Islander people made up 1.8 per cent of the population, which is lower than the national and averages of 2.8 per cent and lower than the NSW state average of 2.9 per cent. The median age of people in the Byron Shire area is 44 years (up from the 42 in the 2011 census) which was slightly higher than the national median of 38 years. Children aged 0 – 14 years made up 16.8 per cent of the population (down from 18.5 in the 2011 census) and people aged 65 years and over made up 16.9 per cent per cent of the population (up from 13.3 per cent). This change over the 5-year period shows evidence of an increasingly ageing population in the Byron Shire which is in line with predictions of the nations future increase in age. The ABS records marital status in everyone over the age of 15, in Byron Shire 37.1 per cent of the population is married whilst 18.1 per cent are divorced or separated. Whilst there has been little change in Byron since the 2011 census, compared to the national percentages there is a large difference. Of the Australian population aged 15 and older 48.1 per cent of the population is married and 11.7 per cent of the population is divorced or separated. This shows that Byron Shire has a large discrepancy in marital status compared to the rest of the nation.

Population in the Byron Shire area has increased since the 2011 census with a population growth of 8 percent, this is a significant increase compared to the population growth between the 2006 and 2011 census which was 1.54 per cent. Whilst the growth since 2011 is similar to the Australian population growth on 8.8 percent, the growth in previous years, negative 0.51 per cent in 2001 to 2006 and 1.54 per cent in 2006 to 2011, is vastly different from the total population growth. This data suggests that Byron Shire's population is growing at an increasing rate much like the majority of Australia. Byron Shire has an average of 2.4 people per dwelling, the same as in the 2011 census, and on average there are 1.8 motor vehicles per dwelling. In terms of median income Byron Shire lags behind the Australian average, with the median personal income in Byron Shire being $596 and the Australian median income being $662. The gap is even larger in the median household income bracket grouping with the Australian national median being $1438 compared to Byron Shire's $1149.

A large proportion of Byron Shire residents are born in Australia with 68.4 per cent of the population, 52 percent of the population have had both parents born in Australia, meaning less than half the population is first generation Australian or a migrant. The second largest country of origin is England with only 5.1 per cent, this reflects the diversity of those that aren't Australian born. Religion in Byron Shire is substantially different compared to the Australian population as a whole, 46.3 per cent of the Byron Shire population listed 'No Religion' in their 2016 census compared with only 25.1 per cent Australian wide. A total of 12.5 per cent of Byron Shire identified as Catholic contrasted to 24.7 per cent of Australia's population. Byron Shire area had a significantly lower proportion of houses where two or more languages are spoken at 9 per cent compared to the national amount of 26.5. The vast majority of houses in Byron Shire, 81.1, speak only English at home whereas 68.5 of houses Australia wide only speak English at home.

Population
The table below gives a picture of the estimated resident population as at the census night. Between 1911 and 1966, data was sourced from the New South Wales Statistical Register, covering the Byron Shire and Mullumbimby Municipality. Since 1976, data was sourced from the Australian Bureau of Statistics for the merged Byron Shire.

Council

Current composition and election method
Byron Shire Council is composed of nine Councillors, including the Mayor, for a fixed four-year term of office. The Mayor is directly elected while the eight other Councillors are elected proportionally as one entire ward. The most recent election was held on 4 December, 2021 and the makeup of the council, including the Mayor, is as follows:

The current Council, elected in 2021, in order of election, is:

References 

 
Local government areas of New South Wales
Northern Rivers
Byron Bay, New South Wales